Loris Hoskins Baker (November 12, 1930 – June 5, 2007), was an American football player in the National Football League (NFL) for the Washington Redskins, Cleveland Browns, Dallas Cowboys and Philadelphia Eagles. While he played several positions, he was best known for being a punter and kicker. He played college football at Oregon State University.

Early years
Baker attended Stadium High School, before transferring after his junior year to Corvallis High School where he graduated in 1949. He was an all-around standout in track, but at the time there wasn't a state decathlon championship, so he only participated in individual events.

He helped his team win the 1948 state championship in basketball and also lettered in baseball. He has the distinction of receiving All-State honors in both Washington and Oregon.

College career
Baker accepted a football scholarship from Oregon State University. He spent the 1949 season on the rookie team. He lettered for the varsity team from 1950 to 1952 as a running back/kicker/safety.

As a sophomore, he rushed for 668 yards (fourth in the conference). As a junior, he rushed for 830 yards (second in the conference). In his career at Oregon State University, Baker gained 2,043 yards on 487 carries and was the school record-holder in both categories when he left. He was voted most valuable player by teammates for three straight years.

He currently ranks eighth in career yards, and sixth in career carries. He had five 100-yard games, with a best of 159 on 30 carries in the 1951 Civil War game at Hayward Field. He scored the final touchdown at old Bell Field in the final 1952 home game

In 1980, he was inducted into the State of Oregon Sports Hall of Fame. In 1991, he was inducted into the Oregon State University Sports Hall of Fame.

Professional career

Los Angeles Rams
Baker was selected by the Los Angeles Rams in the eleventh round (133rd overall) of the 1952 NFL Draft with a future draft pick, which allowed the team to draft him before his college eligibility was over. On July 6, 1953, his draft rights were sold to the Washington Redskins.

Washington Redskins
In 1953, he played sparingly in his first season with the Washington Redskins, before spending two years out of football, while serving his military service at Fort Ord.

In 1956, although he was initially being considered for the right halfback position, he was asked to become the team's kicker after Vic Janowicz suffered a serious brain injury in an automobile accident that ended his athletic career. That same year he also became the punter after Eddie LeBaron was sidelined with an injury. He was given the nickname "Sugarfoot", after leading the NFL in field goals (17), starting an 11-year streak of averaging at least 40 yards per punt attempt and being named to the Pro Bowl.

In 1957, he tied with Lou Groza with a league-high 77 points (including 6 scored on a fake punt he ran in for a touchdown).

In 1958, his 45.4-yard punting average was the best in the league, while he still managed to convert 25 extra points in 25 attempts. On April 25, 1960, he was traded to the Cleveland Browns in exchange for Fran O'Brien and Robert Khayat.

Cleveland Browns
In 1960, he relinquished his fullback duties with the Cleveland Browns and would replace the retired Groza. He led the NFL in extra points made (44) and extra points attempted (46). He posted a 42-yard punting average.

In 1961, Groza returned to the team after his back felt better and Baker focused only on punting. He was the league's eighth ranked punter with an average of 43.3-yards per punt. On December 30, he was traded to the Dallas Cowboys in exchange for cornerback Tom Franckhauser.

Dallas Cowboys
In 1962, he set the team record of 45.4 yards-per-punt that was not broken until 2006 by Mat McBriar with a 48.2-yard average. He also set club records for most points scored in a season (92), longest field goal (53 yards) and longest punt (72 yards). He was the NFL leader in extra points made (50), extra points attempted (51), ranked third in punting average and sixth in scoring.

In 1963, he became the first Cowboys punter to make the Pro Bowl, after registering a 45.4-yard average. His 40.6-yard net average per punt still ranks third in team history.

Baker played two seasons as a punter and kicker for the Dallas Cowboys, until his disregard for the team rules and discipline wore thin with head coach Tom Landry. In both years he led the league in net punting average. He also became the first player in club history to have 2 seasons with a 44-yard or better gross punting average.

On March, 20, 1964, he was traded to the Philadelphia Eagles along with John Meyers and Lynn Hoyem, in exchange for wide receiver Tommy McDonald.

Philadelphia Eagles
Baker remained with the Philadelphia Eagles for the last six seasons of his career. He played in the 1964 and 1968 Pro Bowls. He was waived on September 2, 1970.

Upon retiring he was the second scorer (977 points) in NFL history and held the record of scoring in 110 straight games. He played for 15 seasons, making more than 700 punts and 179 field goals.

Personal life
Baker died due to complications from diabetes on June 5, 2007.

References

External links
From Head to Toe, Baker Stood Apart From Crowd
Oregon Sports Hall of Fame bio

1930 births
2007 deaths
Players of American football from Tacoma, Washington
American football punters
American football placekickers
Oregon State Beavers football players
Washington Redskins players
Cleveland Browns players
Dallas Cowboys players
Philadelphia Eagles players
Eastern Conference Pro Bowl players
Corvallis High School (Oregon) alumni